Houndslow is a hamlet in the Scottish Borders area of Scotland. Immediately to the south is the former village of Bassendean, with the 17th-century Bassendean House.

See also
List of places in the Scottish Borders

External links
RCAHMS record for Houndslow, Parish of Westruther
RCAHMS record for Shuttle Ha', Houndslow

Villages in the Scottish Borders
Hamlets in Scotland